I Told You is the debut studio album by Canadian rapper Tory Lanez. It was released on August 19, 2016, through Mad Love Records and Interscope Records. Recording sessions took place from 2015 to 2016. The production on the album was contributed by Lanez, alongside several other record producers such as Benny Blanco, Cashmere Cat, Frank Dukes, DJ Dahi, Pop Wansel and Noah Breakfast, among others.

I Told You was supported by two singles: "Say It" and "Luv". The album received generally mixed reviews from music critics but despite that, it was a commercial success. It debuted at number four on the US Billboard 200 chart, earning 52,000 album-equivalent units in its first week.

Recording and production 
In an interview with HotNewHipHop, Lanez spoke on the album: "I was tryna come up with a title for mad long and that what was kind of slowing me down cause I didn't want to make music off the wrong title... I might fuck around and not put no features on it. It has to have features that I can put on it and then there's those days where I'm like 'you know, I don't really need any features on it'. I prefer albums in the 10-12 [track list range], you know that 18 be too long sometime because sometimes I wanna listen to an album from top to front and 18 songs is like 70 minutes of music. That's too much for me to comprehend and understand and I really want people to look at the musicalities of what we're putting out as far as the product and how good it is."

Release and promotion
In August 2015, Lanez performed on the Mac Miller's GO:OD AM Tour. On October 15, 2015, the singer announced that he will be headlining "The Swavenation Tour" with fellow American rapper Boogie. On December 25, 2015, these mixtapes such as Chixtape III and The New Toronto were promoted as the prelude for his major-label debut album.

On April 1, 2016, the singer and fellow American rapper ASAP Ferg announced that they will be performing in "The Level Up Tour", setting up the two to performed in a special joint set, trading off between their own tracks and collaborations. On June 10, 2016, Lanez revealed the title to the album and tweeted, "The Album is coming this summer".

On July 7, 2016, the singer announced that he will be headlining the I Told You tour, to support the album. The tour started on July 22, in WayHome Music & Arts Festival in Oro-Medonte, Ontario. Lanez will be traveling across North America through December 2016, with stops at Lollapalooza, Austin City Limits, Made in America, and the Mad Decent Block Party.

Singles 
On July 15, 2015, Lanez released the first single from the album, called "Say It". The song was produced by Pop Wansel and Toro. The music video was released on August 11, 2015. The song peaked at number 23 on the US Billboard Hot 100, and number 10 on the US Hot R&B/Hip-Hop Songs charts. On July 29, 2016, Lanez released the second single from the album, called "Luv" on iTunes. The song was produced by Cashmere Cat and Benny Blanco. The song peaked at number 19 on the US Billboard Hot 100, and number 9 on the US Hot R&B/Hip-Hop Songs charts.

Critical reception 

I Told You received a mixed response upon release. At Album of the Year, which assigns a normalized rating out of 100 to reviews from mainstream critics, the album received an average score of 58 based on six reviews.

In a positive review, online publication HotNewHipHop, who collectively rated the album an 80, described the album as an "ambitious and lavish" project that showed that Lanez's future seemed "only brighter from here". Kevin Ritchie of Now was also positive towards the project, saying that the album made "a convincing case for Lanez's pop appeal".

Commercial performance 
I Told You debuted at number four on the US Billboard 200 chart, earning 52,000 album-equivalent units (including 32,000 copies as pure album sales) in its first week. This became Tory Lanez's first US top-ten debut on the chart. The album also debuted at number two on the US Top R&B/Hip-Hop Albums chart. In its second week, the album dropped to number 16 on the chart, earning an additional 21,000 units. As of March 2018, the album has earned 538,000 album-equivalent units and 95,000 copies in pure album sales in the US, according to Nielsen Music. On March 16, 2021, the album was certified gold by the Recording Industry Association of America (RIAA) for combined sales and album-equivalenut units of over 500,000 units in the United States.

Track listing
Credits adapted from the album's liner notes.

Notes
  signifies a co-producer
 A skit is featured in between each track
 "I Told You / Another One" features additional vocals by Nichole Gilbert and Teisha J. Brown
 "Guns And Roses" and "4AM Flex" features additional vocals by Kadeem Brown and Elizabeth Ruiz
 "Flex" features additional vocals by Kadeem Brown and Mikhail McCreath
 "To D.R.E.A.M." features additional vocals by Javeon McCarthy and Kadeem Brown
 "High" and "Dirty Money" features additional vocals by Elizabeth Ruiz and Robert Brown
 "Question Is" features vocals by Brianna Cash and additional vocals by Teisha J. Brown, Nichole Gilbert and Elizabeth Ruiz
 "Loners Blvd" features additional vocals by Matthew Adam, Sebastian Jorge Rompotis and Sonstar Peterson
 "Say It" features additional vocals by Elizabeth Ruiz

Sample credits
  "Say It" contains elements and samples from "If You Love Me", written by Gordon Chambers, David Hall and Nichole Gilbert, as performed by Brownstone.
 "Luv" contains interpolations from "Everyone Falls In Love", written by Anthony Kelly, Wayne Passley, Mark Wolfe and Stephen Marsden, as performed by Tanto Metro & Devonte
 "Come Back to Me" contains elements and samples from "No Letting Go", written by Von Charles and Stephen Marsden, as performed by Wayne Wonder.
 "High" contains a sample of "In the Meantime", written and performed by Tinashe, Produced by T-Minus.
 "Friends With Benefits" contains a sample of "Stunt", written and performed by Tinashe, Produced by Frank Dukes & !llmind.

Personnel
Credits adapted from the album's liner notes.

Musicians
 Play Picasso – instrumentation , programming 
 Lavish – instrumentation , programming 
 Two Inch Punch – instrumentation , programming 
 Noah Breakfast – instrumentation , programming 
 Matti Free – instrumentation , programming 
 XXYYXX – instrumentation , programming 
 Happy Perez – instrumentation , programming 
 Sergio R. – instrumentation , programming 
 Frank Dukes – instrumentation , programming 
 Benny Blanco – instrumentation , programming 
 Cashmere Cat – instrumentation , programming 
 Daystar Peterson – instrumentation , programming 
 Pop Wansel – instrumentation , programming 
 Autoro Whitfield – keyboards , instrumentation , programming 
 Jameel Roberts – keyboards 
 DJ Dahi – instrumentation , programming 
 Ben Free – instrumentation , programming 

Technical
 Daniel "Play Picasso" Gonzalez – engineering 
 Johann Chavez – engineering 
 Noah" Breakfast" Beresin – engineering 
 Daniel Fyfe – engineering 
 DJ Dahi – engineering 
 Kyle VandeKerhoff – engineering 
 Juan Carlos Torrado – engineering 
 Joe Gallagher – engineering 
 Mark "Spike" Stent – mixing 
 Geoff Swan – mixing assistance 
 Michael Freeman – mixing assistance 
 Chris Gehringer – mastering 

Production
 Zvi "The Real Hoody Allen" Edelman – production coordination 
 Andrew "McMuffin" Luftman – production coordination 
 Seif "Mageef" Hussain – production coordination 
 Astrid "Aaaaastriiiiid" Taylor – production coordination 
 Sascha Stone Guttfreund – production coordination 
 Joey Mingioni - production coordination 
 Brandon "Bdot" Zajac - production coordination 
 Donnie Meadows – production coordination 
 Tanisha Broadwater – production coordination 

Additional personnel
 Matt Adam – creative director
 Nick Bilardello – creative director
 Stephanie Hsu – coordinator

Charts

Weekly charts

Year-end charts

Certifications

References

2016 debut albums
Tory Lanez albums
Albums produced by Benny Blanco
Albums produced by DJ Dahi
Albums produced by Frank Dukes
Albums produced by Cashmere Cat
Albums produced by Happy Perez
Albums produced by D33J
Interscope Records albums